Kovk may refer to two settlements in Slovenia, Central Europe:

 Kovk, Hrastnik in central Slovenia
 Kovk, Ajdovščina in western Slovenia